Willie Martin (born April 27, 1951) is a former offensive lineman who played ten seasons in the Canadian Football League, six of them with the Edmonton Eskimos.  He won two Grey Cups for the Edmonton Eskimos.

References

1951 births
Living people
American players of Canadian football
Canadian football offensive linemen
Edmonton Elks players
Hamilton Tiger-Cats players
People from Alexander City, Alabama
Northeastern State RiverHawks football players
Toronto Argonauts players
Winnipeg Blue Bombers players
Players of American football from Alabama